This listing contains taxa of plants in the division Bryophyta, recorded from South Africa. Mosses, or the taxonomic division Bryophyta, are small, non-vascular flowerless plants that typically form dense green clumps or mats, often in damp or shady locations. The individual plants are usually composed of simple leaves that are generally only one cell thick, attached to a stem that may be branched or unbranched and has only a limited role in conducting water and nutrients. Although some species have conducting tissues, these are generally poorly developed and structurally different from similar tissue found in vascular plants. Mosses do not have seeds and after fertilisation develop sporophytes with unbranched stalks topped with single capsules containing spores.

Mosses are commonly confused with hornworts, liverworts and lichens. Mosses were formerly grouped with the hornworts and liverworts as "non-vascular" plants in the division "bryophytes", all of them having the haploid gametophyte generation as the dominant phase of the life cycle. This contrasts with the pattern in all vascular plants (seed plants and pteridophytes), where the diploid sporophyte generation is dominant. Lichens may superficially resemble mosses, and sometimes have common names that include the word "moss" (e.g., "reindeer moss" or "Iceland moss"), but they are not related to mosses. Mosses are now classified on their own as the division Bryophyta. There are approximately 12,000 species.

23,420 species of vascular plant have been recorded in South Africa, making it the sixth most species-rich country in the world and the most species-rich country on the African continent. Of these, 153 species are considered to be threatened. Nine biomes have been described in South Africa: Fynbos, Succulent Karoo, desert, Nama Karoo, grassland, savanna, Albany thickets, the Indian Ocean coastal belt, and forests.

The 2018 South African National Biodiversity Institute's National Biodiversity Assessment plant checklist lists 35,130 taxa in the phyla Anthocerotophyta (hornworts (6)), Anthophyta (flowering plants(33534)), Bryophyta (mosses (685)), Cycadophyta (cycads (42)), Lycopodiophyta (Lycophytes(45)), Marchantiophyta (liverworts (376)), Pinophyta (conifers (33)), and Pteridophyta {cryptograms(408)).

Listing
Abietinella abietina (Hedw.) M.Fleisch. indigenous
Acaulon leucochaete I.G.Stone, indigenous
Acaulon recurvatum Magill, endemic
Acaulon rufochaete Magill
Acaulonopsis eureka R.H.Zander & Hedd. endemic
Acaulonopsis fynbosensis R.H.Zander & Hedd. indigenous
Aerobryopsis capensis (Mull.Hal.) M.Fleisch. indigenous
Algaria nataliei Hedd. & R.H.Zander, endemic
Aloina bifrons (De Not.) Delgad. indigenous
Amphidium lapponicum (Hedw.) Schimp. indigenous
Amphidium tortuosum (Hornsch.) Cufod. indigenous
Anacolia breutelii (Schimp. ex Mull.Hal.) Magill indigenous
Anacolia breutelii (Schimp. ex Mull.Hal.) Magill var. breutelii indigenous
Anacolia breutelii (Schimp. ex Mull.Hal.) Magill var. squarrifolia (Sim) Magill indigenous
Andreaea acutifolia Hook.f. & Wilson, indigenous
Andreaea alpina Hedw. indigenous
Andreaea bistratosa Magill, indigenous
Andreaea nitida Hook.f. & Wilson, indigenous
Andreaea rupestris Hedw. indigenous
Andreaea subulata Harv. indigenous
Anoectangium wilmsianum (Mull.Hal.) Paris, indigenous
Anomobryum drakensbergense Van Rooy, indigenous
Anomobryum julaceum (Schrad. ex G.Gaertn., B.Mey. & Schreb.) Schimp. indigenous
Anomodon pseudotristis (Mull.Hal.) Kindb. indigenous
Aongstroemia filiformis (P.Beauv.) Wijk & Margad. indigenous
Aongstroemia julacea (Hook.) Mitt. indigenous
Archidium acanthophyllum Snider, indigenous
Archidium amplexicaule Mull.Hal. indigenous
Archidium andersonianum Snider, endemic
Archidium capense Hornsch. indigenous
Archidium julicaule Mull.Hal. indigenous
Archidium microthecium Dixon & P.de la Varde, indigenous
Archidium muellerianum Snider, indigenous
Archidium ohioense Schimp. ex Mull.Hal. indigenous
Archidium rehmannii Mitt. indigenous
Archidium subulatum Mull.Hal. indigenous
Astomiopsis magilliana Snider, K.L.Yip & J.R.Clark, endemic
Atractylocarpus madagascariensis (Ther.) Padberg & J.-P.Frahm, indigenous
Atrichum androgynum (Mull.Hal.) A.Jaeger, indigenous
Aulacopilum trichophyllum Angstr. indigenous
Barbula bolleana (Mull.Hal.) Broth. indigenous
Barbula calycina Schwagr. indigenous
Barbula convoluta Hedw. indigenous
Barbula eubryum Mull.Hal. indigenous
Barbula indica (Hook.) Spreng. indigenous
Barbula microcalycina Magill, indigenous
Barbula unguiculata Hedw. indigenous
Bartramia aristaria Mull.Hal. indigenous
Bartramia capensis (R.Br.) Wijk & Margad. indigenous
Bartramia compacta Hornsch. indigenous
Bartramia compacta Hornsch. var. compacta, indigenous
Bartramia compacta Hornsch. var. macowaniana (Mull.Hal.) Magill, endemic
Bartramia hampeana Mull.Hal. indigenous
Brachymenium acuminatum Harv. indigenous
Brachymenium chilense Ochi & Mahu, indigenous
Brachymenium dicranoides (Hornsch.) A.Jaeger, indigenous
Brachymenium leptophyllum (Bruch & Schimp. ex Mull.Hal.) Bruch & Schimp. ex A.Jaeger, indigenous
Brachymenium nepalense Hook. indigenous
Brachymenium pulchrum Hook. indigenous
Brachymenium systylium (Mull.Hal.) A.Jaeger, indigenous
Brachythecium implicatum (Hornsch. ex Mull.Hal.) A.Jaeger, indigenous
Brachythecium pinnatum Dixon, endemic
Brachythecium plumosum (Hedw.) Schimp. indigenous
Brachythecium populeum (Hedw.) Schimp. indigenous
Brachythecium pseudopopuleum (Schimp. ex Mull.Hal.) Schimp. endemic
Brachythecium pseudovelutinum (Hampe ex Mull.Hal.) A.Jaeger, endemic
Brachythecium ruderale (Brid.) W.R.Buck, indigenous
Brachythecium salebrosum (Hoffm. ex F.Weber & D.Mohr) Schimp. indigenous
Brachythecium subrutabulum (Mull.Hal.) A.Jaeger, indigenous
Braunia secunda (Hook.) Bruch & Schimp. indigenous
Breutelia diffracta Mitt. indigenous
Breutelia elliptica Magill, endemic
Breutelia microdonta (Mitt.) Broth. indigenous
Breutelia substricta (Schimp.) Magill, indigenous
Breutelia tabularis Dixon, endemic
Brothera leana (Sull.) Mull.Hal. indigenous
Bruchia brevipes Harv. ex Hook. indigenous
Bruchia eckloniana Mull.Hal. indigenous
Bryobartramia schelpei Hedd. indigenous
Bryoerythrophyllum campylocarpum (Mull.Hal.) H.A.Crum, indigenous
Bryoerythrophyllum recurvirostrum (Hedw.) P.C.Chen, indigenous
Bryum alpinum Huds. ex With. indigenous
Bryum andicola Hook. indigenous
Bryum apiculatum Schwagr. indigenous
Bryum argenteum Hedw. indigenous
Bryum aubertii (Schwagr.) Brid. indigenous
Bryum caespiticium Hedw. indigenous
Bryum canariense Brid. indigenous
Bryum capillare Hedw. indigenous
Bryum cellulare Hook. indigenous
Bryum dichotomum Hedw. indigenous
Bryum donianum Grev. indigenous
Bryum erythrocaulon (Schwagr.) Brid. indigenous
Bryum pseudotriquetrum (Hedw.) G.Gaertn., B.Mey. & Scherb. indigenous
Bryum pycnophyllum (Dixon) Mohamed, indigenous
Bryum radiculosum Brid. indigenous
Bryum rubens Mitt. indigenous
Bryum ruderale Crundw. & Nyholm, indigenous
Bryum subapiculatum Hampe, indigenous
Bryum torquescens Bruch ex De Not. indigenous
Bryum turbinatum (Hedw.) Turner, indigenous
Bryum viguieri Ther. indigenous
Bryum viridescens Welw. & Duby, indigenous
Callicostella tristis (Mull.Hal.) Broth. indigenous
Calymperes levyanum Besch. indigenous
Calymperes pallidum Mitt. indigenous
Calymperes tenerum Mull.Hal. indigenous
Calyptrochaeta asplenioides (Brid.) Crosby, indigenous
Campylopus acuminatus Mitt. indigenous
Campylopus acuminatus Mitt. var. kirkii (Mitt.) J.-P.Frahm, indigenous
Campylopus ampliretis (Mull.Hal.) Paris, indigenous 
Campylopus arctocarpus (Hornsch.) Mitt. indigenous
Campylopus arctocarpus (Hornsch.) Mitt. subsp. madecassus (Besch.) J.-P.Frahm, indigenous
Campylopus atroluteus (Mull.Hal.) Paris, indigenous
Campylopus aureonitens (Mull.Hal.) A.Jaeger, indigenous
Campylopus bartramiaceus (Mull.Hal.) Paris, indigenous
Campylopus bequaertii Ther. & Naveau, indigenous
Campylopus bewsii Sim, indigenous
Campylopus bicolor (Hornsch. ex Mull.Hal.) Wilson subsp. atroluteus (Mull.Hal.) J.-P.Frahm, indigenous
Campylopus cambouei Renauld & Cardot, indigenous
Campylopus carolinae Grout, indigenous
Campylopus catarractilis (Mull.Hal.) Paris, indigenous
Campylopus chlorotrichus (Mull.Hal.) Paris, indigenous
Campylopus clavatus (R.Br.) Wilson, indigenous
Campylopus controversus (Hampe) A.Jaeger, indigenous
Campylopus decaryi Ther. indigenous
Campylopus delagoae (Mull.Hal.) Paris, indigenous
Campylopus echinatus Rehmann ex Sim, indigenous
Campylopus edwardsii Sim, indigenous
Campylopus flaccidus Renauld & Cardot, indigenous
Campylopus fragilis (Brid.) Bruch, Schimp. indigenous
Campylopus griseolus (Mull.Hal.) Paris, indigenous
Campylopus hensii Renauld & Cardot, indigenous
Campylopus hildebrandtii (Mull.Hal.) A.Jaeger, indigenous
Campylopus inchangae (Rehmann ex Mull.Hal.) Paris, indigenous
Campylopus introflexus (Hedw.) Brid. indigenous
Campylopus jamesonii (Hook.) A.Jaeger, indigenous
Campylopus lepidophyllus (Mull.Hal.) A.Jaeger, indigenous
Campylopus leptotrichaceus (Mull.Hal.) Paris, indigenous
Campylopus longescens (Mull.Hal.) Paris, indigenous
Campylopus nanophyllus Mull.Hal. ex Broth. indigenous
Campylopus nivalis (Brid.) Brid. indigenous
Campylopus pallidus Hook. & Wilson, indigenous
Campylopus perpusillus Mitt. indigenous
Campylopus pilifer Brid. indigenous
Campylopus pilifer Brid. var. pilifer, indigenous
Campylopus pilifer Brid. var. simii (Schelpe) J.-P.Frahm & Hedd. endemic
Campylopus praetermissus J.-P.Frahm, indigenous
Campylopus procerus (Mull.Hal.) Paris, indigenous
Campylopus pseudobicolor Mull.Hal. ex Renauld & Cardot, indigenous
Campylopus pseudojulaceus Sim, indigenous
Campylopus pulvinatus (Mull.Hal.) Paris, indigenous
Campylopus purpurascens Lorentz, indigenous
Campylopus pyriformis (F.W.Schultz) Brid. indigenous
Campylopus robillardei Besch. indigenous
Campylopus savannarum (Mull.Hal.) Mitt. indigenous
Campylopus simii Schelpe, indigenous
Campylopus stenopelma (Mull.Hal.) Rehmann ex Paris, indigenous
Campylopus thwaitesii (Mitt.) A.Jaeger, indigenous
Campylopus trichodes Lorentz, indigenous
Campylopus vesticaulis Mitt. indigenous
Cardotiella secunda (Mull.Hal.) Vitt, endemic
Catagonium nitens (Brid.) Cardot, indigenous
Catagonium nitens (Brid.) Cardot subsp. maritimum (Hook.) S.H.Lin, indigenous
Ceratodon purpureus (Hedw.) Brid. indigenous
Ceratodon purpureus (Hedw.) Brid. subsp. stenocarpus (Bruch & Schimp. ex Mull.Hal.) Dixon, indigenous
Chamaebryum pottioides Ther. & Dixon, indigenous
Cheilothela chilensis (Mont.) Broth.
Chenia leptophylla (Mull.Hal.) R.H.Zander
Chenia ruigtevleia Hedd. & R.H.Zander, indigenous
Chrysoblastella chilensis (Mont.) Reimers, indigenous
Chryso-hypnum cavifolium (Dixon) Ochyra & Sharp, indigenous
Cladophascum gymnomitrioides (Dixon) Dixon, indigenous
Codonoblepharon menziesii Schwagr. indigenous
Codonoblepharon microtheca (Dixon ex Malta) Matcham & O'Shea, indigenous
Conostomum pentastichum (Brid.) Lindb. indigenous
Conostomum tetragonum (Hedw.) Lindb. indigenous
Cratoneuron filicinum (Hedw.) Spruce, indigenous
Crossidium apiculatum Magill, indigenous
Crossidium karoo R.H.Zander & Hedd. indigenous
Crossidium spiralifolium Magill, indigenous
Cryphaea exigua (Mull.Hal.) A.Jaeger, indigenous
Cryphaea jamesonii N.P.Taylor, indigenous
Cryphaea rutenbergii Mull.Hal. indigenous
Cyclodictyon vallis-gratiae (Hampe ex Mull.Hal.) Kuntze, indigenous
Cygnicollum immersum Fife & Magill, endemic
Dicranella cardotii (R.Br.bis) Dixon, indigenous
Dicranella hookeri (Mull.Hal.) Cardot, indigenous
Dicranella rigida Dixon, endemic
Dicranella subsubulata (Hampe ex Mull.Hal.) A.Jaeger, indigenous
Dicranoloma billardieri (Brid.) Paris, indigenous
Dicranoloma entabeniense Magill, endemic
Dicranoweisia antarctica (Mull.Hal.) Paris, indigenous
Didymodon australasii (Hook. & Grev.) R.H.Zander, indigenous
Didymodon ceratodonteus (Mull.Hal.) Dixon, indigenous
Didymodon tophaceopsis R.H.Zander, indigenous
Didymodon tophaceus (Brid.) Lisa, indigenous
Didymodon trivialis (Mull.Hal.) J.Guerra, endemic
Didymodon umbrosus (Mull.Hal.) R.H.Zander, indigenous
Didymodon xanthocarpus (Mull.Hal.) Magill, indigenous
Dimerodontium africanum Mull.Hal. endemic
Dimerodontium balansae Mull.Hal. indigenous
Dimerodontium pellucidum (Schwagr.) Mitt. indigenous
Distichium capillaceum (Hedw.) Bruch & Schimp. indigenous
Distichophyllum mniifolium (Hornsch.) Sim, indigenous
Distichophyllum mniifolium (Hornsch.) Sim var. mniifolium, indigenous
Distichophyllum mniifolium (Hornsch.) Sim var. taylorii (Sim) Magill, endemic
Ditrichum brachypodum (Mull.Hal.) Broth. indigenous
Ditrichum difficile (Duby) M.Fleisch. indigenous
Ditrichum punctulatum Mitt. indigenous
Ditrichum strictum (Hook.f. & Wilson) Hampe, indigenous
Drepanocladus hallii Broth. & Dixon, indigenous
Drepanocladus polygamus (Schimp.) Hedenas, indigenous
Drepanocladus sparsus Mull.Hal. indigenous
Drepanophyllaria caudicaule Mull.Hal. endemic
Eccremidium exiguum (Hook.f. & Wilson) Wilson, indigenous
Ectropothecium brachycarpum (Dixon) Magill, endemic
Ectropothecium perrotii Renauld & Cardot, indigenous
Ectropothecium regulare (Brid.) A.Jaeger, indigenous
Encalypta ciliata Hedw. indigenous
Encalypta vulgaris Hedw. indigenous
Entodon cymbifolius Wager & Dixon, indigenous
Entodon dregeanus (Hornsch.) Mull.Hal. indigenous
Entodon geminidens (Besch.) Paris, indigenous
Entodon macropodus (Hedw.) Mull.Hal. indigenous
Entodon natalensis Rehmann ex Mull.Hal. indigenous
Entodon stereophylloides Broth. indigenous
Entodontopsis nitens (Mitt.) W.R.Buck, indigenous
Ephemerum capense Mull.Hal. indigenous
Ephemerum diversifolium Mitt. endemic
Ephemerum namaquense Magill, endemic
Ephemerum rehmannii (Mull.Hal.) Broth. indigenous
Erpodium beccarii Mull.Hal. indigenous
Erpodium coronatum (Hook.f. & Wilson) Mitt. indigenous
Erpodium coronatum (Hook.f. & Wilson) Mitt. subsp. transvaaliense (Broth. & Wager) Magill, indigenous 
Erpodium distichum Wager & Dixon, indigenous
Erythrodontium squarrosum (Hampe) Paris, indigenous
Erythrodontium subjulaceum (Mull.Hal.) Paris, indigenous
Eurhynchiella zeyheri (Spreng. ex Mull.Hal.) M.Fleisch. indigenous
Eustichia longirostris (Brid.) Brid. indigenous
Fabronia abyssinica Mull.Hal. indigenous
Fabronia breutelii Hampe, endemic
Fabronia eckloniana Hampe, endemic
Fabronia gueinzii Hampe, indigenous
Fabronia leikipiae Mull.Hal. indigenous
Fabronia perciliata Mull.Hal. endemic
Fabronia pilifera Hornsch. indigenous
Fabronia rehmannii Mull.Hal. indigenous
Fabronia victoriae Dixon, indigenous
Fabronia wageri Dixon, endemic
Felipponea assimilis (Mull.Hal.) O'Shea
Fissidens aciphyllus Dixon, endemic
Fissidens asplenioides Hedw. indigenous
Fissidens beckettii Mitt. indigenous
Fissidens bogosicus Mull.Hal. indigenous
Fissidens borgenii Hampe, indigenous
Fissidens bryoides Hedw. indigenous
Fissidens curvatus Hornsch. indigenous
Fissidens curvatus Hornsch. var. curvatus, indigenous
Fissidens enervis Sim, indigenous
Fissidens erosulus (Mull.Hal.) Paris, indigenous
Fissidens fasciculatus Hornsch. endemic
Fissidens gladiolus Mitt. indigenous
Fissidens glaucescens Hornsch.
Fissidens hoeegii P.de la Varde
Fissidens intramarginatus (Hampe) Mitt. indigenous
Fissidens marginatus Schimp. ex Mull.Hal.
Fissidens megalotis Schimp. & Mull.Hal. indigenous
Fissidens megalotis Schimp. ex Mull.Hal. subsp. megalotis, indigenous
Fissidens microandrogynus Dixon
Fissidens nitens Rehmann
Fissidens ovatus Brid. indigenous
Fissidens palmifolius (P.Beauv.) Broth. indigenous
Fissidens parvilimbatus Sim
Fissidens plumosus Hornsch. indigenous
Fissidens porrectus Mitt. indigenous
Fissidens pseudoserratus (Mull.Hal.) A.Jaeger, indigenous
Fissidens pygmaeus Hornsch. indigenous
Fissidens rufescens Hornsch. indigenous
Fissidens sciophyllus Mitt. indigenous
Fissidens scleromitrius (Besch.) Broth. indigenous
Fissidens simii Schelpe
Fissidens splachnifolius Hornsch. indigenous
Fissidens stellenboschianus Dixon
Fissidens submarginatus Bruch, indigenous
Fissidens subobtusatus Mull.Hal.
Fissidens usambaricus Broth. indigenous
Fissidens wageri Dixon, endemic
Floribundaria floribunda (Dozy & Molk.) M.Fleisch. indigenous
Fontinalis antipyretica Hedw. indigenous
Fontinalis antipyretica Hedw. var. gracilis (Lindb.) Schimp. indigenous
Fontinalis squamosa Hedw. indigenous
Forsstroemia producta (Hornsch.) Paris, indigenous
Funaria bergiana (Hornsch.) Broth. indigenous
Funaria clavata (Mitt.) Magill, endemic
Funaria hygrometrica Hedw. indigenous
Funaria limbata (Mull.Hal.) Broth. indigenous
Funaria longicollis Dixon, indigenous
Funaria rhomboidea J.Shaw, indigenous
Funaria rottleri (Schwagr.) Broth. indigenous
Funaria spathulata Schimp. ex Mull.Hal. indigenous
Funaria succuleata (Wager & C.H.Wright) Broth. ex Magill, indigenous
Funaria urceolata (Mitt.) Magill, indigenous
Gammiella ceylonensis (Broth.) B.C.Tan & W.R.Buck, indigenous
Gemmabryum ruderale (Crundw. & Nyholm) J.R.Spence, indigenous
Gigaspermum repens (Hook.) Lindb. indigenous
Goniomitrium africanum (Mull.Hal.) Broth. indigenous
Grimmia argyrotricha Mull.Hal. indigenous
Grimmia donniana Sm. indigenous
Grimmia elongata Kaulf. indigenous
Grimmia fuscolutea Hook. indigenous
Grimmia laevigata (Brid.) Brid. indigenous
Grimmia longirostris Hook. indigenous
Grimmia pulvinata (Hedw.) Sm. indigenous
Grimmia reflexidens Mull.Hal. indigenous
Grimmia sanii Greven, synonym
Grimmia trichophylla Grev. indigenous
Gymnostomum aeruginosum Sm. indigenous
Gymnostomum bewsii Sim, indigenous
Gymnostomum lingulatum Rehmann ex Sim, endemic
Haplocladium angustifolium (Hampe & Mull.Hal.) Broth. indigenous
Haplohymenium pseudotriste (Mull.Hal.) Broth. synonym
Hedwigia ciliata (Hedw.) P.Beauv. indigenous
Hedwigidium integrifolium (P.Beauv.) Dixon, indigenous
Helicodontium lanceolatum (Hampe & Mull.Hal.) A.Jaeger, endemic
Hennediella longipedunculata (Mull.Hal.) R.H.Zander, indigenous
Herpetineuron toccoae (Sull. & Lesq.) Cardot, indigenous
Holomitrium cylindraceum (P.Beauv.) Wijk & Margad. indigenous
Holomitrium cylindraceum (P.Beauv.) Wijk & Margad. var. cucullatum (Besch.) Wijk & Margad. indigenous
Hookeriopsis pappeana (Hampe) A.Jaeger, indigenous
Hookeriopsis utacamundiana (Mont.) Broth. indigenous
Hygroamblystegium caudicaule (Mull.Hal.) Broth. indigenous
Hylocomiopsis cylindricarpa Ther. indigenous
Hymenostylium recurvirostre (Hedw.) Dixon, indigenous
Hyophila baginsensis Mull.Hal. indigenous
Hyophila involuta (Hook.) A.Jaeger, indigenous
Hypnum cupressiforme Hedw. indigenous
Hypnum cupressiforme Hedw. var. cupressiforme, indigenous
Hypnum cupressiforme Hedw. var. filiforme Brid. indigenous
Hypnum cupressiforme Hedw. var. lacunosum Brid. indigenous
Hypnum cupressiforme Hedw. var. mossmanianum (Mull.Hal.) Ando, indigenous
Hypnum macrogynum Besch. indigenous
Hypodontium dregei (Hornsch.) Mull.Hal. indigenous
Hypodontium pomiforme (Hook.) Mull.Hal. indigenous
Hypopterygium laricinum (Hook.) Brid. synonym
Hypopterygium tamarisci (Sw.) Brid. ex Mull.Hal. indigenous
Ischyrodon lepturus (Taylor) Schelpe, indigenous
Isopterygium leucophanes (Hampe ex Mull.Hal.) A.Jaeger, indigenous
Isopterygium leucopsis (Mull.Hal.) Paris, endemic
Isopterygium punctulatum Broth. & Wager, endemic
Isopterygium strangulatum (Hampe ex Mull.Hal.) Broth. endemic
Isopterygium taxithellioides Broth. & Bryhn, endemic
Isopterygium taylorii Sim, endemic
Isopterygium tenerum (Hedw.) Mitt. indigenous
Jaegerina stolonifera (Mull.Hal.) Mull.Hal. indigenous
Juratzkaea incisa (W.R.Buck) Catches. & I.G.Stone, endemic
Kindbergia praelonga (Hedw.) Ochyra, indigenous
Lepidopilidium hanningtonii (Mitt.) Broth. indigenous
Leptobryum pyriforme (Hedw.) Wilson, indigenous
Leptodictyum riparium (Hedw.) Warnst. indigenous
Leptodon smithii (Hedw.) F.Weber & D.Mohr, indigenous
Leptodontium brachyphyllum Broth. & Ther. indigenous
Leptodontium longicaule Mitt. indigenous
Leptodontium pungens (Mitt.) Kindb. indigenous
Leptodontium viticulosoides (P.Beauv.) Wijk & Margad. indigenous
Leptoischyrodon congoanus Dixon, indigenous
Leptophascum leptophyllum (Mull.Hal.) J.Guerra & Cano, indigenous
Leptopterigynandrum austro-alpinum Mull.Hal. indigenous
Leptopterigynandrum subintegrum (Mitt.) Broth. indigenous
Leptotheca gaudichaudii Schwagr. indigenous
Leptotrichella minuta (Hampe) Ochyra, indigenous
Leskeella zuluensis Broth. & Bryhn, endemic
Leucobryum acutifolium (Mitt.) Cardot, indigenous
Leucobryum madagassum Besch. indigenous
Leucobryum rehmannii Mull.Hal. endemic
Leucodon assimilis (Mull.Hal.) A.Jaeger, synonym
Leucoloma chrysobasilare (Mull.Hal.) A.Jaeger, indigenous
Leucoloma chrysobasilare (Mull.Hal.) A.Jaeger subsp. africana La Farge, indigenous
Leucoloma entabeniense (Magill) La Farge, endemic
Leucoloma rehmannii (Mull.Hal.) Rehmann ex Paris, indigenous
Leucoloma scabricuspis Broth. indigenous
Leucoloma sprengelianum (Mull.Hal.) A.Jaeger, endemic
Leucoloma syrrhopodontoides Broth. indigenous
Leucoloma zeyheri (Mull.Hal.) Kindb. indigenous
Leucoloma zuluense Broth. & Bryhn, indigenous
Levierella neckeroides (Griff.) O'Shea & Matcham, indigenous
Levierella perserrata P.de la Varde & J.-F.Leroy, endemic
Lewinskya armata (Lewinsky & Van Rooy) F.Lara, Garilleti & Goffinet, endemic
Lewinskya firma (Venturi) F.Lara, Garilleti & Goffinet, indigenous
Lewinskya incurvomarginata (Lewinsky & Van Rooy) F.Lara, Garilleti & Goffinet, endemic
Lewinskya rupestris (Schleich.) F.Lara, Garilleti & Goffinet, indigenous
Lindbergia haplocladioides Dixon, indigenous
Lindbergia patentifolia Dixon, indigenous
Lindbergia pseudoleskeoides Dixon, indigenous
Lindbergia viridis Dixon, indigenous
Lopidium pennaeforme (Thunb. ex Brid.) M.Fleisch. endemic
Lopidium struthiopteris (Brid.) M.Fleisch. indigenous
Ludorugbya springbokorum Hedd. & R.H.Zander, endemic
Macrocoma lycopodioides (Schwagr.) Vitt, indigenous
Macrocoma pulchella (Hornsch.) Vitt, endemic
Macrocoma tenuis (Hook. & Grev.) Vitt, indigenous
Macrocoma tenuis (Hook. & Grev.) Vitt subsp. tenuis, indigenous
Macromitrium lebomboense Van Rooy, endemic
Macromitrium levatum Mitt. indigenous
Macromitrium macropelma Mull.Hal. endemic
Macromitrium microstomum (Hook. & Grev.) Schwagr. endemic
Macromitrium richardii Schwagr. indigenous
Macromitrium serpens (Bruch ex Hook. & Grev.) Brid. indigenous
Macromitrium sulcatum (Hook.) Brid. indigenous
Meiothecium fuscescens (A.Jaeger ex Paris) Broth. endemic
Metzleria madagascariensis (Ther.) J.-P.Frahm, indigenous
Microbryum davallianum (Sm.) R.H.Zander, indigenous
Microbryum davallianum (Sm.) R.H.Zander var. conicum (Schleich. ex Schwagr.) R.H.Zander, endemic
Microbryum rufochaete (Magill) R.H.Zander, endemic
Microbryum subplanomarginatum (Dixon) R.H.Zander, indigenous
Microcrossidium apiculatum (Magill) J.Guerra & Cano, endemic
Micromitrium perexiguum (Mull.Hal.) Crosby, indigenous
Micropoma niloticum (Delile) Lindb. indigenous
Mielichhoferia bryoides (Harv.) Wijk & Margad. indigenous
Mielichhoferia subnuda Sim, indigenous
Mittenothamnium ctenidioides (Dixon) Schelpe, indigenous
Mittenothamnium cygnicollum (Dixon) Wijk & Margad. indigenous
Mittenothamnium horridulum (Broth.) Cardot, indigenous
Mittenothamnium patens (Hampe) Cardot, indigenous
Mittenothamnium pseudoreptans (Mull.Hal.) Cardot, indigenous
Mittenothamnium reptans (Hedw.) Cardot, indigenous
Neckera complanata (Hedw.) Huebener, indigenous
Neckera valentiniana Besch. indigenous
Nogopterium gracile (Hedw.) Crosby & W.R.Buck, indigenous
Octoblepharum albidum Hedw. indigenous
Oedipodiella australis (Wager & Dixon) Dixon, indigenous
Oligotrichum afrolaevigatum (Dixon) G.L.Sm. indigenous
Oligotrichum capense Schelpe & Fanshawe, indigenous
Oligotrichum tetragonum Schelpe & Fanshawe, indigenous
Oligotrichum wageri (Broth.) G.L.Sm. endemic
Oreoweisia erosa (Hampe ex Mull.Hal.) Kindb. indigenous
Orthodontium lineare Schwagr. indigenous
Orthostichella pandurifolia (Mull.Hal.) W.R.Buck, indigenous
Orthostichopsis pinnatella (Broth.) Broth. indigenous
Orthostichopsis subimbricata (Hampe) Broth. indigenous
Orthotrichum armatum Lewinsky & Van Rooy, endemic
Orthotrichum diaphanum Brid. indigenous
Orthotrichum firmum Venturi, indigenous
Orthotrichum incurvomarginatum Lewinsky & Van Rooy, endemic
Orthotrichum karoo F.Lara, Garilleti & Mazimpaka, indigenous
Orthotrichum rupestre Schleich. ex Sim, indigenous
Orthotrichum subexsertum Schimp. ex Mull.Hal. indigenous
Orthotrichum transvaaliense Rehmann ex Sim, endemic
Oxyrrhynchium confervoidum Sim, endemic
Oxyrrhynchium subasperum Sim, endemic
Palamocladium leskeoides (Hook.) E.Britton, indigenous
Papillaria africana (Mull.Hal.) A.Jaeger, indigenous
Pelekium ramusculosum (Mitt.) Touw, indigenous
Pelekium varians (Welw. & Duby) Touw, indigenous
Pelekium versicolor (Hornsch. ex Mull.Hal.) Touw, indigenous
Phascum peraristatum Mull.Hal.
Philonotis africana (Mull.Hal.) Rehmann ex Paris, indigenous
Philonotis caespitosa Wilson ex Milde, indigenous
Philonotis comosa (Broth.) D.G.Griffin & W.R.Buck, endemic
Philonotis dregeana (Mull.Hal.) A.Jaeger, indigenous
Philonotis falcata (Hook.) Mitt. indigenous
Philonotis globosa (Mull.Hal.) D.G.Griffin & W.R.Buck, indigenous
Philonotis hastata (Duby) Wijk & Margad. indigenous
Philonotis scabrifolia (Hook.f. & Wilson) Braithw. indigenous
Philonotis vagans (Hook.f. & Wilson) Mitt. indigenous
Physcomitrellopsis africana Wager & Broth. ex Dixon, endemic
Physcomitrium spathulatum Mull.Hal. indigenous
Physcomitrium spathulatum Mull.Hal. var. sessile (J.Shaw) Magill, endemic
Physcomitrium spathulatum Mull.Hal. var. spathulatum, indigenous
Picobryum atomicum R.H.Zander & Hedd. indigenous
Pilotrichella cuspidata Broth. synonym
Pilotrichella kuntzei Mull.Hal. synonym
Pilotrichella pandurifolia (Mull.Hal.) A.Jaeger, indigenous
Pinnatella minuta (Mitt.) Broth. indigenous
Plagiobryum zierii (Dicks. ex Hedw.) Lindb. indigenous
Plagiomnium rhynchophorum (Hook.) T.J.Kop. indigenous
Plagiomnium rhynchophorum (Hook.) T.J.Kop. var. reidii (Dixon) T.J.Kop. indigenous
Plagiopus oederianus (Sw.) H.A.Crum & L.E.Anderson, indigenous
Plagiothecium lamprostachys (Hampe) A.Jaeger, indigenous
Plagiothecium membranosulum Mull.Hal. indigenous
Plagiothecium rhynchostegioides Mull.Hal. synonym
Platygyriella densa (Hook.) W.R.Buck, indigenous
Platyhypnidium macowanianum (Paris) M.Fleisch. indigenous
Platyneuron praealtum (Mitt.) Ochyra & Bednarek-Ochyra, indigenous
Plaubelia involuta (Magill) R.H.Zander, indigenous
Pleuridium ecklonii (Hampe ex Mitt.) Snider, indigenous
Pleuridium nervosum (Hook.) Mitt. indigenous
Pleuridium papillosum Magill, endemic
Pleuridium pappeanum (Mull.Hal.) A.Jaeger, indigenous
Pleuridium subulatum (Hedw.) Rabenh. indigenous
Pogonatum belangeri (Mull.Hal.) A.Jaeger, indigenous
Pogonatum borgenii (Hampe) A.Jaeger, endemic
Pogonatum capense (Hampe) A.Jaeger, indigenous
Pogonatum oligodus (Kunze ex Mull.Hal.) Mitt. synonym
Pogonatum perichaetiale (Mont.) A.Jaeger, indigenous
Pogonatum perichaetiale (Mont.) A.Jaeger subsp. oligodus (Kunze ex Mull.Hal.) Hyvonen, indigenous
Pogonatum usambaricum (Broth.) Paris, indigenous
Pohlia baronii Wijk & Margad. indigenous
Pohlia cruda (Hedw.) Lindb. indigenous
Pohlia elongata Hedw. indigenous
Pohlia integra (Cardot) A.J.Shaw, synonym
Pohlia nutans (Hedw.) Lindb. indigenous
Polytrichastrum formosum (Hedw.) G.L.Sm. indigenous
Polytrichum commune Hedw. indigenous
Polytrichum juniperinum Hedw. indigenous
Polytrichum piliferum Hedw. indigenous
Polytrichum subformosum Besch. indigenous
Polytrichum subpilosum P.Beauv. indigenous
Porothamnium stipitatum (Mitt.) Touw ex De Sloover, indigenous
Porotrichum elongatum (Welw. & Duby) A.Gepp, indigenous
Porotrichum madagassum Kiaer ex Besch. indigenous
Porotrichum stipitatum (Mitt.) W.R.Buck, indigenous
Porotrichum usagarum Mitt. indigenous
Pottia namaquensis Magill, endemic
Pottia splachnoides (Hornsch.) Broth. indigenous
Prionodon densus (Sw. ex Hedw.) Mull.Hal. indigenous
Pseudocrossidium adustum (Mitt.) M.J.Cano, indigenous
Pseudocrossidium crinitum (Schultz) R.H.Zander, indigenous
Pseudocrossidium hornschuchianum (Schultz) R.H.Zander, indigenous
Pseudocrossidium porphyreoneurum (Mull.Hal.) R.H.Zander, indigenous
Pseudocrossidium replicatum (Taylor) R.H.Zander, indigenous
Pseudoleskea leskeoides (Paris) Mull.Hal. indigenous
Pseudoleskeopsis claviramea (Mull.Hal.) Ther. indigenous
Pseudoleskeopsis pseudoattenuata (Mull.Hal.) Ther. indigenous
Pseudoleskeopsis unilateralis Dixon, endemic
Pseudoscleropodium purum (Hedw.) M.Fleisch. indigenous
Pseudosymblepharis angustata (Mitt.) Hilp. indigenous
Pterobryopsis acutifolium (Brid.) Magill, indigenous
Pterobryopsis hoehnelii (Mull.Hal.) Mull.Hal. indigenous
Pterobryopsis rehmannii Magill, endemic
Pterogoniadelphus assimilis (Mull.Hal.) Ochyra & Zijlstra, indigenous
Pterogonium gracile (Hedw.) Sm. indigenous
Pterygoneurum macleanum Warnst. indigenous
Ptychomitriopsis africana Dixon, endemic
Ptychomitriopsis aloinoides Magill, indigenous
Ptychomitrium crassinervium (Mull.Hal.) Schimp. ex Paris, indigenous
Ptychomitrium crispatum (Hedw.) A.Jaeger, indigenous
Ptychomitrium cucullatifolium (Mull.Hal.) A.Jaeger, indigenous
Ptychomitrium depressum (Mull.Hal.) Paris, synonym
Ptychomitrium diexaratum Magill, indigenous
Ptychomitrium eurybasis Dixon, endemic
Ptychomitrium exaratifolium H.Rob. indigenous
Ptychomitrium muelleri (Mitt.) A.Jaeger, indigenous
Ptychomitrium sellowianum (Mull.Hal.) A.Jaeger, indigenous
Ptychomitrium subcrispatum Ther. & P.de la Varde, indigenous
Pyrrhobryum spiniforme (Hedw.) Mitt. indigenous
Pyrrhobryum vallis-gratiae (Hampe ex Mull.Hal.) Manuel, endemic
Quathlamba debilicostata Magill, indigenous
Racomitrium crispipilum (Taylor) A.Jaeger, indigenous
Racomitrium crispulum (Hook.f. & Wilson) Hook.f. & Wilson, indigenous
Racomitrium lamprocarpum (Mull.Hal.) A.Jaeger, indigenous
Racomitrium lanuginosum (Hedw.) Brid. indigenous
Racopilum capense Mull.Hal. ex Broth. indigenous
Rauiella praelonga (Schimp. ex Besch.) Wijk & Margad. indigenous
Rhabdoweisia crispata (Dicks. ex With.) Lindb. indigenous
Rhabdoweisia fugax (Hedw.) Bruch & Schimp. indigenous
Rhachithecium perpusillum (Thwaites & Mitt.) Broth. indigenous
Rhacocarpus purpurascens (Brid.) Paris, indigenous
Rhacopilopsis flexilis (Renauld & Cardot) W.R.Buck, synonym
Rhacopilopsis transvaaliensis (Ther. & Dixon) W.R.Buck, synonym
Rhacopilopsis trinitensis (Mull.Hal.) E.Britton & Dixon, indigenous
Rhacopilopsis variegata (Welw. & Duby) M.C.Watling & O'Shea, indigenous
Rhodobryum commersonii (Schwagr.) Paris, indigenous
Rhodobryum keniae (Mull.Hal.) Broth. indigenous
Rhodobryum roseum (Hedw.) Limpr. indigenous
Rhodobryum umbraculum (Bruch ex Hook.) Schimp. ex Paris, indigenous
Rhynchostegiella holstii (Broth.) Broth. indigenous
Rhynchostegiella litorea (De Not.) Limpr. indigenous
Rhynchostegiella sublaevipes Broth. & Bryhn, endemic
Rhynchostegiella zeyheri (Spreng. ex Mull.Hal.) Broth. indigenous
Rhynchostegium brachypterum (Hornsch.) A.Jaeger, indigenous
Rhynchostegium raphidorrhynchum (Mull.Hal.) A.Jaeger, indigenous
Rhynchostegium subbrachypterum Broth. & Bryhn, endemic
Rigodium toxarion (Schwagr.) A.Jaeger, indigenous
Rosulabryum capillare (Hedw.) J.R.Spence, indigenous
Rosulabryum rubens (Mitt.) J.R.Spence, indigenous
Saelania glaucescens (Hedw.) Broth. indigenous
Sanionia uncinata (Hedw.) Loeske, indigenous
Schistidium apocarpum (Hedw.) Bruch & Schimp. indigenous
Schlotheimia ferruginea (Bruch ex Hook. & Grev.) Brid. indigenous
Schlotheimia percuspidata Mull.Hal. indigenous
Schlotheimia rufopallens Mull.Hal. endemic
Schoenobryum concavifolium (Griff.) Gangulee, indigenous
Schoenobryum welwitschii (Duby) Manuel, endemic
Scopelophila cataractae (Mitt.) Broth. indigenous
Sematophyllum brachycarpum (Hampe) Broth. indigenous
Sematophyllum dregei (Mull.Hal.) Magill, indigenous
Sematophyllum gueinzii (Hampe) Magill, indigenous
Sematophyllum magillianum P.E.A.S.Câmara & Van Rooy, indigenous
Sematophyllum sphaeropyxis (Mull.Hal.) Broth. indigenous
Sematophyllum subpinnatum (Brid.) E.Britton, indigenous
Sematophyllum wageri C.H.Wright ex Wager, indigenous
Sematophyllum zuluense (Sim) Magill, endemic
Sphaerothecium subchlorophyllosum (Mull.Hal.) J.-P.Frahm, indigenous
Sphagnum africanum Welw. & Duby, indigenous
Sphagnum capense Hornsch. indigenous
Sphagnum fimbriatum Wilson, indigenous
Sphagnum perichaetiale Hampe, indigenous
Sphagnum pycnocladulum Mull.Hal. indigenous
Sphagnum strictum Sull. indigenous
Sphagnum strictum Sull. subsp. pappeanum (Mull.Hal.) A.Eddy, indigenous
Sphagnum truncatum Hornsch. indigenous
Sphagnum violascens Mull.Hal. indigenous
Squamidium brasiliense (Hornsch.) Broth. indigenous
Stereophyllum natalense Sim, synonym
Stereophyllum odontocalyx (Mull.Hal.) A.Jaeger, synonym
Stereophyllum radiculosum (Hook.) Mitt. indigenous
Stereophyllum woodii (Sim) Magill, indigenous
Stoneobryum mirum (Lewinsky) D.H.Norris & H.Rob. endemic
Streptocalypta pulchriretis (Dixon) R.H.Zander, endemic
Streptopogon erythrodontus (Taylor) Wilson, indigenous
Streptopogon erythrodontus (Taylor) Wilson var. rutenbergii (Mull.Hal.) E.S.Salmon, synonym
Syntrichia ammonsiana (H.A.Crum & L.E.Anderson) Ochyra, indigenous
Syntrichia amphidiacea (Mull.Hal.) R.H.Zander, endemic
Syntrichia antarctica (Hampe) R.H.Zander, indigenous
Syntrichia austro-africana (W.A.Kramer) R.H.Zander, indigenous
Syntrichia chisosa (Magill, Delgad. & L.R.Stark) R.H.Zander, indigenous
Syntrichia fragilis (Taylor) Ochyra, indigenous
Syntrichia laevipila Brid. indigenous
Syntrichia leucostega (Mull.Hal.) R.H.Zander, indigenous
Syntrichia leucostega (Mull.Hal.) R.H.Zander var. leucostega, indigenous
Syntrichia leucostega (Mull.Hal.) R.H.Zander var. trachyneura (Dixon) R.H.Zander, endemic
Syntrichia magilliana L.E.Anderson, endemic
Syntrichia norvegica F.Weber, indigenous
Syntrichia norvegica F.Weber var. norvegica, indigenous
Syntrichia pagorum (Milde) J.J.Amann, indigenous
Syntrichia papillosa (Wilson) Jur. indigenous
Syntrichia princeps (De Not.) Mitt. indigenous
Syntrichia rubella (Hook. & Wilson) R.H.Zander, indigenous
Syntrichia ruralis (Hedw.) F.Weber & Mohr, indigenous
Syrrhopodon asper Mitt. indigenous
Syrrhopodon gaudichaudii Mont. indigenous
Tayloria isleana (Besch.) Broth. indigenous
Tayloria orthodonta (P.Beauv.) Wijk & Margad. indigenous
Tetrapterum tetragonum (Hook.) A.L.Andrews, endemic
Thamniopsis utacamundiana (Mont.) W.R.Buck, indigenous
Thuidium assimile (Mitt.) A.Jaeger, indigenous
Thuidium matarumense Besch. indigenous
Timmiella pelindaba Magill indigenous
Tortella fragilis (Hook. & Wilson) Limpr. indigenous
Tortella humilis (Hedw.) Jenn. indigenous
Tortella xanthocarpa (Schimp. ex Mull.Hal.) Broth. indigenous
Tortula atrovirens (Sm.) Lindb. indigenous
Tortula austro-africana W.A.Kramer, synonym
Tortula bogosica (Mull.Hal.) R.H.Zander, indigenous
Tortula muralis Hedw. indigenous
Tortula splachnoides (Hornsch.) R.H.Zander, indigenous
Trachypodopsis serrulata (P.Beauv.) M.Fleisch. indigenous
Trachypus bicolor Reinw. & Hornsch. indigenous
Trachypus bicolor Reinw. & Hornsch. var. viridulus (Mitt.) Zanten, indigenous
Trematodon divaricatus Bruch, indigenous
Trematodon intermedius Welw. & Duby, indigenous
Trematodon longicollis Michx. indigenous
Trematodon mayottensis Besch. indigenous
Trematodon paradoxus Hornsch. indigenous
Trematodon pillansii Dixon, endemic
Trichosteleum perchlorosum Broth. & Bryhn, indigenous
Trichostomum brachydontium Bruch, indigenous
Trichostomum tenuirostre (Hook. & Taylor) Lindb. indigenous
Trichostomum unguiculatum (Mitt.) R.H.Zander, indigenous
Triquetrella mxinwana Hedd. & R.H.Zander, endemic
Triquetrella tristicha (Mull.Hal.) Mull.Hal. indigenous
Tristichium mirabile (Mull.Hal.) Herzog, indigenous
Ulota ecklonii (Hornsch.) A.Jaeger, endemic
Vesicularia galerulata (Duby) Broth. indigenous
Vittia pachyloma (Mont.) Ochyra, indigenous
Vrolijkheidia circumscissa Hedd. & R.H.Zander, synonym
Vrolijkheidia peraristata (Mull.Hal.) R.H.Zander & Hedd. indigenous
Wardia hygrometrica Harv. & Hook. endemic
Weisiopsis plicata (Mitt.) Broth. indigenous
Weissia controversa Hedw. indigenous
Weissia cucullata Mull.Hal. endemic
Weissia dieterlenii Ther. indigenous
Weissia humicola Mull.Hal. indigenous
Weissia latiuscula Mull.Hal. indigenous
Wijkia trichocolea (Mull.Hal.) H.A.Crum, indigenous
Zygodon corralensis Lorentz, indigenous
Zygodon dixonii Sim, indigenous
Zygodon erosus Mitt. indigenous
Zygodon hookeri Hampe, indigenous
Zygodon hookeri Hampe var. leptobolax (Mull.Hal.) Calabrese, endemic
Zygodon intermedius Bruch & Schimp. indigenous
Zygodon leptobolax Mull.Hal. endemic
Zygodon runcinatus Mull.Hal. indigenous
Zygodon trichomitrius Hook. & Wilson, indigenous

See also

References

South African plant biodiversity lists
Mosses